Spialia struvei is a butterfly in the family Hesperiidae. It is found from Iran to Dzungaria in north-west China . The habitat consists of dry areas on hills and low mountains at altitudes between 200 and 1,000 meters in the steppe-desert zone.

Adults are on wing from June to July.

Subspecies
Spialia struvei struvei
Spialia struvei irida Zhdanko, 1993 (Alaisky Mountains)
Spialia struvei fetida Zhdanko, 1992 (western Kazakhstan)

References

Spialia
Butterflies described in 1914
Butterflies of Asia